Mangelia ossea is a species of sea snail, a marine gastropod mollusk in the family Mangeliidae.

Description

Distribution
This marine species occurs in the Mediterranean Sea off Cagliari, Italy

References

 Nordsieck, F. "Die europäischen Meeres-Gehäuseschnecken." Gustav Fischer Ver (1968).
 Nordsieck, Fritz. Die europäischen Meeres-Gehäuseschnecken (Prosobranchia): vom Eismeer bis Kapverden, Mittelmeer und Schwarzes Meer. Fischer, 1982.

External links
  Tucker, J.K. 2004 Catalog of recent and fossil turrids (Mollusca: Gastropoda). Zootaxa 682:1–1295.
 Worldwide Mollusc Species Data Base : Mangelia ossea

ossea
Gastropods described in 1968